Biastini is a tribe of cuckoo bees in the family Apidae. There are at least 3 genera and about 12 described species in Biastini.

Genera
 Biastes Panzer, 1806
 Neopasites Ashmead, 1898
 Rhopalolemma Roig-Alsina, 1991

References

 Michener, Charles D. (2000). The Bees of the World, xiv + 913.
 Michener, Charles D. (2007). The Bees of the World, Second Edition, xvi + 953.

Further reading

External links

 NCBI Taxonomy Browser, Biastini

Nomadinae